The Rocca Paolina was a Renaissance fortress in Perugia, built in 1540-1543 for Pope Paul III to designs by Antonio da Sangallo the Younger. It destroyed a large number of Etruscan, Roman and medieval buildings, including the Baglioni family's houses in the burgh of Santa Giuliana as well as over a hundred tower-houses, gates, churches and monasteries. It turned the former streets of the historic city centre into underground passageways, which are now open to the public.

The fortress was partially destroyed in 1848 then rebuilt by Pope Pius IX in 1860 before being finally demolished in 1861 after the city was annexed by the Kingdom of Italy. The underground via Bagliona and the remains of the medieval quarter were then uncovered and restored in 1932, with restoration works in 1965. Part of the supporting wall survives on viale Indipendenza and a bastion on via Marzia, housing an exhibition space and museum.

Buildings and structures in Perugia